Norval E. Welch was an American colonel who commanded the 16th Michigan Infantry Regiment during the American Civil War before being killed at the Battle of Peebles's Farm.

Biography
Norval was born around 1835 at Pittsfield Charter Township, Michigan. At some point he moved to Ann Arbor and attended Law School at the University of Michigan before graduating in its first class in 1860. He enlisted for the Union Army on August 22, 1861 and was a commissioned major on the 16th Michigan Infantry Regiment on September 8 to help muster the regiment. He was then promoted to Lieutenant Colonel on 6 July 1862 and would go on to lead the regiment at the Battle of Antietam. He then participated at the Little Round Top where Welch and the 16th Michigan made a defense during the engagement with only 150 men against John Bell Hood's divisions of Texans and Alabamians. However he lost his nerves during the battle and ordered a retreat with 25 men retreating along with him with the remaining men choosing to hold their positions. This prompted Strong Vincent to bolster the remaining line, only to be mortally wounded. He was promoted to full colonel on May 15, 1863 but his reputation was tarnished as he was blaming others for the actions at Little Round Top.

He then spent some time at Detroit as an assistant of recruiting men into the Union Army. Welch would then go on to participate at the Siege of Petersburg and would be a primary commander at the Battle of Peeble's Farm. During the battle, he and the 16th Michigan would approach an entrenched Confederate as he reportedly leaped his sword in hand and shouting at his men "On boys and over!" to cross over the enemy parapet before being fatally shot moments later as he was the first one to mount the redoubt with the attack later succeeding. 

His bravery at Peebles's Farm restored his reputation as Joshua Lawrence Chamberlain commented:

References

1835 births
1864 deaths
People from Washtenaw County, Michigan
Union Army colonels
People of Michigan in the American Civil War
University of Michigan Law School alumni
Union military personnel killed in the American Civil War